The 2010–11 Toto Cup Al was the twenty-nine season of the third most important football tournament in Israel since its introduction and seventh under the current format. It was held in two stages. First, sixteen Premier League teams were divided into four groups. The winners and runners-up, were advanced to the Quarterfinals. Quarterfinals, Semifinals and Final were held as one-legged matches, with the Final played at the Ramat Gan Stadium.

The defending champions were Beitar Jerusalem, who made it their second Toto Cup title overall.

On 19 January 2011, Ironi Kiryat Shmona won the 2010–11 Toto Cup Al, a year after winning the Leumit version of the cup, it was their first Toto Cup Al title overall.

Group stage
The draw took place on June 14, 2010.

The matches were being played from 31 July to 10 November 2010.

Group A

Group B

Group C

Group D

Elimination rounds

Quarterfinals
The matches were played from December 28 to 30, 2010.

1 Score after 90 minutes

2 Maccabi Tel Aviv hosted the match against Maccabi Haifa without a crowd of both sides due to Maccabi Tel Aviv fans hooliganism.

Semifinals
The draw for the Semifinals took place on 30 December 2010, with matches played a week later on January 5, 2011.

1 Score after 90 minutes

Final

See also
 2010–11 Toto Cup Leumit
 2010–11 Israeli Premier League
 2010–11 Israel State Cup

References

External links
 Official website  

Al
Toto Cup Al
Toto Cup Al